Em-orn Phanusit (born March 25, 1988) is a Thai indoor volleyball player of Idea Khonkaen. She is a member of the Thailand women's national volleyball team.

Clubs 
  Khonkaen Star (2008–)

Awards

Individuals
 2012–13 Thailand League "Best Spiker"
 2014–15 Thailand League "Best Opposite Spiker"

Clubs
 2012–13 Thailand League -  Champion, with Idea Khonkaen
 2013 Thai–Denmark Super League -  Champion, with Idea Khonkaen
 2019 Thai–Denmark Super League -  Third, with Khonkaen Star
 2020 Thailand League –  Runner-up, with Khonkaen Star

References

External links
 FIVB Biography

1988 births
Living people
Em-orn Phanusit
Em-orn Phanusit
Asian Games medalists in volleyball
Volleyball players at the 2010 Asian Games
Volleyball players at the 2014 Asian Games
Em-orn Phanusit
Medalists at the 2014 Asian Games
Universiade medalists in volleyball
Em-orn Phanusit
Southeast Asian Games medalists in volleyball
Competitors at the 2009 Southeast Asian Games
Universiade bronze medalists for Thailand
Medalists at the 2013 Summer Universiade
Em-orn Phanusit